This is a list of episodes of The Podge and Rodge Show, with airdates and the relevant guests of the episode in question.

A talk show broadcast and produced by RTÉ, for the first three seasons Podge and Rodge were joined by Lucy Kennedy as a co-host. In the fourth season up until Christmas 2008, they were joined by female guest hosts following Kennedy's departure. Caroline Morahan joined as co-host when the fourth season returned on 9 February 2009. The programme aired each Monday and Tuesday at 22:50 on RTÉ Two from February to April and from October to December with a hiatus during the summer months. The fourth season began on 20 October 2008 and ended on 14 April 2009 and was the last to be filmed in then original Ballydung Manor set. Season five was a truncated season shot in the Stickit Inn set. As part of RTÉ's 2018's autumn launch it was announced that The Podge and Rodge Show would be returning after an eight-year break for a sixth season with new co-host Doireann Garrihy starting on 22 October 2018.

Set in Ballydung Manor, the brothers' home in the village of Ballydung in County Ring, as well as celebrity interviews of a humorous nature it also involved quizzes, reviews, news, music and talent contests, as well as racenights involving among other entities hamsters in mazes, sheep shearing and tractors. During early episodes, with the credits rolling, it was common for the two to tell viewers to direct their complaints elsewhere, e.g. RTÉ or The Joe Duffy Show. The programme's popularity was reflected on the Irish Singles Chart, as The Saw Doctors reached number one on 17 October 2008 with the song "About You Now", first performed on The Podge and Rodge Show as a dare during the "Rock N' Roulette" feature of series three.

Season one

* The Áine Chambers episode was pre-recorded as there was only one show due to the Easter schedule - there was no episode on April 19.

Season two

* There was no episode on Monday February 26 due to the Oscars being broadcast that evening.
The second series ran until April 10, before the highly successful "Desperate for Housewives Tour" restarted at Vicar Street.

Guests that never were
The following were also confirmed as guests in series two, but their order of appearance and episodes were never confirmed. In the end they did not appear, Big Tom's excuse was that he had been ill and hospitalised:
 Bob Geldof
 Big Tom

Season three

Jackass star Chris Pontius a.k.a. Party Boy and his band Scream for Me, who were touring Ireland in November 2007, made a special surprise appearance on 5 November 2007 episode and performed their song "Karazy".
There was no episode on Monday 25 February due to the Academy Awards being broadcast that evening.
Series 3, Episode 35 broadcast on 24 March 2008, was the official 100th episode of The Podge & Rodge Show.
Johnny Vegas became the first guest to return to the show.

Season four
The fourth season introduced the concept of the female guest host after Lucy Kennedy's decision to leave the show. Each guest host presented two shows and were obliged to be female. These included Michelle Heaton, Pamela Flood, Amanda Bonkher, Mary McEvoy, Donna McCaul, Rosanna Davison and Bláthnaid Ní Chofaigh. Every second show featured a new slot, "Rhyme Bandits", in which a well-known singer switched genre and performed in the guise of their selected artist in a style reminiscent of Stars in Their Eyes.

Upon the show's return on 9 February 2009, Podge & Rodge were joined by Caroline Morahan as the new "Lady of Ballydung Manor" for the remaining ten weeks of season four (from Ep.4.21). The musical item 'Rock 'n' Roulette from Season three returned as 'Rockin' Recession Roulette' where up and coming Irish bands performed cover versions of Podge and Rodge's choosing. Tuesday nights saw a new item entitled The Antiques Gameshow where old Irish TV game shows were resurrected and given a Ballydung twist. For instance, geography quiz Where in the World? became an anatomical quiz Where on the Girl?.

1. There was no episode on 18 November 2008 due to a Munster v. All Blacks rugby game at Thomond Park. An episode of Prison Break was subsequently broadcast in the show's usual slot. There were also no episodes on 29 December and 30 December.

Future guests were to include
 Peaches Geldof

Season five
After the short-lived quiz show format of Podge and Rodge's Stickit Inn (see below), which reverted to a chat show mid-series, Podge and Rodge returned on 23 February 2010 for a ten-week run under the original title of The Podge and Rodge Show For the first time the show did not have a female co-host. The running time returned to the original 30-minute format but featured three celebrity guests and a music act per show.

Season six
After an eight-year absence Podge and Rodge return to Ballydung Manor with co-host Doireann Garrihy.

Seasonal specials

An Audience with Podge and Rodge (2005)
The precursor to The Podge and Rodge Show was broadcast on 26 December 2005 with guests Ray D'Arcy and Amanda Brunker. Music from Ding Dong Denny O'Reilly and VT inserts from various Irish personalities including Gerry Ryan, Nell McCafferty, Foster and Allen, PJ Gallagher, Mary Black  with their memories and opinions of Podge and Rodge. There were also clips from A Scare at Bedtime. The show was filmed in front of a studio audience of skeletons and one man and his dog.

A Frightmare Before Christmas (2006)
Podge and Rodge hosted a special show from Ballydung Manor on 19 December, entitled A Frightmare Before Christmas. It celebrated Christmas from their perspective, a reality where none of the intended guests turned up, and imaginary scenarios where the worst possible guests did. In reality Podge and Rodge and Lucy were left in the darkness of Ballydung Manor as the thunder raged outside, imagining their nightmare guests.

Lucy dreamed of interviewing June Rodgers and lo and behold a flashback occurred featuring June being interviewed by the two. In the "imaginary" interview they made fun of her name, suggesting it had hidden pornographic innuendos. At the end of the flashback, the studio was still empty, leading Lucy to fill time by showing a special report of her interviewing people on the streets and asking them such questions as "When do you empty your sack?".

Podge then revealed his nightmare guest would be George Murphy, and in his imaginary interview an old tape was unearthed of him embarrassing himself on You're a Star. The interview was broken up by a return to reality whereby Podge had fallen asleep out of boredom.

In the second half of the show Lucy revealed the reason for the lack of guests; a plague of locusts was flocking towards the Ballydung bypass and Colin Farrell was being held up in a Moscow phone booth. Rodge's nightmare guest was revealed to be Shane MacGowan whom Rodge asked had he sold his soul to Satan. They showed him what he would look like if he had plastic surgery (including face liposuction and €3000 teeth) before comparing his new appearance to that of Christy Dignam. Podge and Rodge joined George Murphy to sing out the show with "The Irish Rover".

Bogmanay (2006)
Podge and Rodge rang in 2007 on 31 December 2006/1 January 2007 in a special programme lasting over forty minutes instead of the usual thirty-minute format. The New Year's Eve show was called Bogmanay (a play on Hogmanay). It was broadcast on RTÉ Two from 11.30p.m.

On it the boys looked back at some of the highlights of their year. They also handed out their very own Feckin' Eejit of the Year Awards (FEEJITs) to celebrate the great tradition of Irish Feckin' Eejitry. There were nine nominees chosen from the worlds of TV, entertainment, sport and politics.

Guests included Edele  and Keavy Lynch of B*Witched fame, Mary Black, Jason Donovan and Freddie Starr returned as the Ballydung Butler for the evening.

Bogmanay II (2007)
Such was the success of the original Bogmanay, Podge and Rodge hosted a second Bogmanay to ring in 2008. It featured guests Miss Ireland, Bláthnaid McKenna and boxer Frank Bruno as well as Mr. Gest who was unable to be interviewed as Lucy Kennedy, venturing into his dressing room, discovered he had turned into an ape. Instead a number of previously unseen clips which were not allowed to be shown before midnight were shown, including some in which Lucy Kennedy swore. A number of "Half- Arse Hero" awards were handed out, although none of the recipients (who included Steve Staunton) were present to accept them.

Podge and Rodge's Christmas Craic (2008)
Twink guest hosted this 26 December special. The O'Leprosy brothers were joined by osteopath and film star Mark Lester, impressionist Mario Rosenstock and music from The Stunning, who resurrected the "Rock 'N' Roulette" feature of the previous series to sing the Slade song "Merry Xmas Everybody". The show attracted 271,000 viewers.

Podge and Rodge's Stickit Inn
A pub quiz for the first four episodes, by the fifth episode it had reverted to a comedy chat show similar to The Podge and Rodge Show but based in the Stickit Inn pub set.

Podge and Rodge's Late Night Lock Inn (2009)
A Christmas Special billed as Podge and Rodge's Late Night Lock Inn was broadcast on RTÉ Two on 26 December 2009. Featuring guests Joe Duffy, Johnny Vegas, Jennie McAlpine aka. Fiz from Coronation Street and Irish comedian Katherine Lynch.

References

External links
 

Podge and Rodge Show